Francis Coster (or Frans de Costere) (Mechelen, 16 June 1532 (1531) - Brussels, 16 December 1619) was a Flemish Jesuit, theologian and author.

Life
Frans de Costere was received into the Society of Jesus by St. Ignatius on 7 November 1552. While still a young man he was sent to Cologne (western Germany) and lectured there on Sacred Scripture and astronomy. His reputation as a professor was established within a very short time, and on 10 December 1564, the university of Cologne conferred on him the degree of Doctor of Philosophy and Theology.

He was ever ready to defend the teaching of the Catholic Church, which at this period was engaged in the struggle with Protestant 'new ideas', and by word and by writing he brought people back to Catholicism. He was for two terms provincial of the Jesuit province of Belgium, for one term provincial of that of the Rhine, and assisted at three General Congregation of his order.

In 1575 he was recalled to Cologne to lead the College of the Three Crowns, after its previous rector was murdered. While there he established two local sodalities, the Sodality of the Blessed Sacrament and the Sodality of the Blessed Virgin.

Works
The catalogue of his writings (De Backer, I, 218) mentions forty-two titles. They include works on ascetical subjects, meditations on the Blessed Virgin Mary, and sermons on the Gospel for each Sunday of the year.

Probably the most famous was his "Enchiridion controversiarum præcipuarum nostri temporis de Religione" (Cologne, 1585, 1587, 1589, 1593). This was afterwards revised and enlarged by its author in 1596, 1605, 1608; and was translated into various languages.

To each of the attacks made upon it by Protestant writers, such as Philip Marbach, Franciscus Gommar or Lucas Osiander, Coster gave an able reply. His works directed against these opponents are entitled: "Liber de Ecclesiâ contra Franciscum Gommarum" (Cologne, 1604); "Apologia adversus Lucæ Osiandri hæretici lutherani refutationum octo propositionum catholicarum" (Cologne, 1606); "Annotationes in N. T. et in præcipua loca, quæ rapi possent in controversiam" (Antwerp, 1614).

References

Attribution

1532 births
Flemish writers
1619 deaths
Roman Catholic theologians of the Habsburg Netherlands
Jesuits of the Habsburg Netherlands